Terrance Laird (born October 12, 1998) is an American track and field athlete specializing in the 100 meters and 200 meters sprints.

Career
Laird's freshman year was at Penn State in 2017-18, where he won the Men's Freshman of the Year award in the Big Ten conference. He struggled academically at Penn State and transferred to Hinds Community College in Mississippi for his sophomore year.

Laird moved on to Louisiana State University where he competed collegiately for the LSU Tigers. On 27 March 2021, Laird ran a 19.81 200 metres at the Texas Relays meet, which was the third fastest time in NCAA history. His performance was even more impressive due to his negative split, running the first 100m in 10.39 seconds and his final in 9.42 seconds, which is one of the fastest closes for the 200 metres in history. He also finished second to Matthew Boling at the 2021 NCAA Division I Indoor Track and Field Championships in the 200m, finishing in 20.20 seconds. This was also the 8th fastest all time indoor 200 metres. Terrance Laird also holds the 4th fastest wind aided 200m run of all time, running 19.64 (+5.6) on May 17, 2019.  On May 15, 2021, Laird had a similar achievement running 9.80 +3.2 for 100 meters, one of the top 20 performers under any circumstances in that event. He was awarded the Commissioners Trophy for the most points at the SEC event, where he won the 100 and 200 meters and anchored the winning 4x100 meter relay team.

Personal bests

Information from World Athletics profile.

National championship results

NCAA and NJCAA results from Track & Field Results Reporting System profile.

Notes

References

External links

 (Track & Field Results Reporting System)

1998 births
Living people
Track and field athletes from Pennsylvania
People from Coatesville, Pennsylvania
American male sprinters
African-American male track and field athletes
LSU Tigers track and field athletes
Pennsylvania State University alumni
21st-century African-American sportspeople
Penn State Nittany Lions men's track and field athletes
Hinds Community College alumni